Sporn may refer to:

Andrej Sporn (born 1981), former Slovenian alpine skier
Jon Sporn (born 1997), Slovenian football midfielder
Kieran Sporn (born 1966), former Australian rules footballer
Michael B. Sporn (born 1933), professor emeritus of pharmacology, toxicology and medicine at Dartmouth Medical School
Michael Sporn (1946–2014), American animator who founded his New York City-based company, Michael Sporn Animation
Pam Sporn, filmmaker and teacher
Philip Sporn (1896–1978), Austrian electrical engineer, president and CEO of the American Gas and Electric Company
Rachael Sporn OAM (born 1968), Australian former basketball player and three time Olympian
Stane Sporn or Stane Šporn (born 1904), Yugoslav long-distance runner
Trent Sporn (born 1982), former Australian rules footballer

See also
Leininger Sporn, highly prominent ridge in the northeast of the Palatinate Forest in western Germany